Route 21, also known as Bunbury Road and Fort Augustus Road, is a , two-lane, uncontrolled-access,  secondary highway in central Prince Edward Island. Its western terminus is at Route 1 in Southport and its eastern terminus is at Route 323 in Fanning Brook. The route is in Queens and Kings counties.

Route description 

The route begins at its western terminus and heads east, crosses Fullerton Creek, and takes a right turn in Mermaid. The route then crosses several more rivers, including the Pisquid River, before ending at its eastern terminus.

References 

021
021
021